Szentbalázs is a village in Somogy county, Hungary.

History
According to László Szita the settlement was completely Hungarian in the 18th century.

Twin city 

 Zalaszentbalázs

External links 
 Street map (Hungarian)

References 

Populated places in Somogy County